The Madre del Buon Consiglio (or Basilica dell'Incoronata Madre del Buon Consiglio or Maria del Buon Consiglio) (Italian: Crowned Mother of Good Counsel) is a Roman Catholic church in Naples, southern Italy. It is located on the hillside leading up to the Capodimonte palace and art museum and is visible from many quarters of the city. The church houses a number of works of art rescued from closed, damaged, or abandoned houses of worship in the city. It was building from 1920 to 1960.

History
The church has its roots in two miracles observed by local girl Maria di Gesù Landi (21 January 1861 – 26 March 1931). Known for her devotion to Our Lady of Good Counsel (Madonna del Buon Consiglio), she created a painting of the saint in 1884, which apparently stopped an outbreak of cholera in the city in that year. 22 years later, the same painting appeared to clear the ash clouds from the 1906 eruption of Mount Vesuvius.

Vincenzo Vecchio designed the church in model of St. Peter's in Rome. The church was constructed between 1920 and 1940, on top of the ancient Catacombs of San Gennaro. It has become the destination of pilgrimages in the name of Maria di Gesù Landi.

The 1980 Irpinia earthquake toppled the head of the statue of the Madonna from the top of the church to the ground, where it crashed and lay inexplicably undamaged.

External links

Page at napoligrafia.it 

Basilica churches in Naples
Roman Catholic churches completed in 1960
20th-century Roman Catholic church buildings in Italy